The Liberaal Vlaams Verbond (E: Liberal Flemish League) was founded in 1913. From its origin it wanted to promote the Flemish cause and drew attention to social matters, within the Belgian Liberal Party.  Together with the Willemsfonds and the Liberaal Vlaams Studentenverbond, it is one of the Flemish liberal organizations.

History 
The first attempt to create an organization which brings together the Flemish liberal politicians, seems to have happened in 1908. Julius Hoste Sr., Pol De Mont, Max Rooses, and Maurits Basse were present at the meeting.  In addition there were two liberal conferences for Flanders on 28 January 1912 and 5 October 1913. At the conference of 1913 it was decided that an organization would be founded to realise the program of the conference: liberal, Flemish and social.  The first name which was proposed was Verbond van Vlaamsche Liberale Kiezerskorpsen and its first president was Emile De Puydt from Antwerp.  The first general assembly convened on 16 October 1913, and on this occasion the name Liberaal Vlaams Verbond (LVV) was decided upon.  One of its co-founders was Julius Hoste Sr. (1848–1933), the founder of the liberal newspaper Het Laatste Nieuws.

Over the years, several Flemish liberal politicians, were/are member of the LVV, such as Julius Hoste Sr., Karel Buls (1837–1914), Julius Hoste Jr. (1884–1954), Herman Teirlinck, Frans Grootjans, Willy De Clercq, to name a few.

Members of the Board of Governors

President 
 1913: Emile De Puydt
 1914: E. Stubbe
 1919-1923: Jules Somers
 1923-1926: Arthur Vanderpoorten
 1926-1928: Jean Sach
 1928-1934: Jules Boedt
 1934-1940: Jules Somers
 1945-1957: Victor Sabbe
 1957-1966: Herman Vanderpoorten
 1966-1967: Louis D'Haeseleer
 1968: Karel Poma
 1969-1972: Herman Vanderpoorten
 1973-1974: Karel Poma
 1974-1982: Louis Waltniel
 1982-1993: Camille Paulus
 1993- : Clair Ysebaert

Secretary 
 1913-1914: Leo Van Hoorick
 1919-1923: Victor Heymans
 1924-1947: Marcel Stijns
 1948-1959: Piet Lenain
 1960-1996: Piet Van Brabant
 1996- : Oscar De Wandel

Chief editor of Volksbelang 
 1960-1970: Piet Van Brabant
 1971-1990: Frans Strieleman
 1990-1996: Piet Van Brabant
 1990-: Bert Cornelis

See also 
 Liberalism in Belgium
 Flemish movement
 Flemish Liberals and Democrats (VLD)
 Liberales
 Liberal Archive

Sources 
 P. Van Brabant, W. Blomme, Als een vuurtoren, 85 jaar Liberaal Vlaams Verbond, Liberaal Archief (1998)

External links 
 Liberaal Vlaams Verbond

Foundations based in Belgium
Flanders
Liberal organizations